Cresaptown is an unincorporated community and census-designated place (CDP) located in Allegany County, Maryland, United States. As of the 2010 census it had a population of 6,247. Prior to 2010 it was part of the Cresaptown-Bel Air CDP. Cresaptown's post office was established December 22, 1800.

Demographics

History

Prior to 1728, Cresaptown was the site of a Shawnee village along the Potomac River. The inhabitants of this region were a portion of the Shawanese tribe, a sub-division of the Algonquian group, one of the most warlike combinations of that period. The warriors engaged in hunting and fishing for food and furs, while their families were left at home to tend the maize and grass that grew in the rich soil of the Potomac valley. The maize was ground into corn meal and made into Shawnee cake, a popular diet of the Shawnees living in the valley.

The Shawanees in the valley lived in shelters composed of two forked posts that were driven into the ground, and on these was laid a ridge pole. This was covered with bark and skins and made tight enough to protect against rain or snow. The floors were spread with furs, which made sure for seats or beds.
Emanuel Custer, father of George Armstrong Custer, was born in Cresaptown 1806, and moved to Ohio in 1845, finally settling in Michigan.

Cresaptown was named for the family of Daniel Cresap, early settlers.

Industry
The North Branch Correctional Institution, a supermax prison facility, is located in Cresaptown.

The 372nd Military Police Company, known for participating in Abu Ghraib prisoner abuse, is based here.

Nearby cities 
 Cumberland, Maryland

See also 
 Thomas Cresap

References

Census-designated places in Allegany County, Maryland
Census-designated places in Maryland
Populated places in the Cumberland, MD-WV MSA
Cumberland, MD-WV MSA
Populated places on the North Branch Potomac River